Joseph Burnett Holland Sr. (September 26, 1925 – September 18, 2010) was an American basketball player.  He won an NCAA championship at the University of Kentucky and played three years in the National Basketball Association from 1949 to 1952.

Holland, a 6'4 forward from Benton, Kentucky, played for Kentucky from 1945 to 1948.  He was a key player for the Wildcats, earning first team All-Southeastern Conference in 1947 and playing a key role in helping Adolph Rupp win his first championship as a part of the 1947–48 Wildcats team.

After graduating from UK in 1949, Holland was drafted by the Baltimore Bullets in the 1948 BAA Draft.  Holland played three seasons with the Indianapolis Olympians, where he was reunited with college teammates Cliff Barker, Ralph Beard, Wah Wah Jones and Jack Parkinson.  Holland played three seasons for the Olympians, averaging 5.8 points, 4.2 rebounds and 2.1 assists per game in 186 total games.

References

External links
 

1926 births
2010 deaths
American men's basketball players
Baltimore Bullets (1944–1954) draft picks
Basketball players from Kentucky
Indianapolis Olympians players
Kentucky Wildcats men's basketball players
People from Benton, Kentucky
Small forwards